Chommaphat Boonloet (born 17 February 2003) is a Thai professional footballer who plays as a goalkeeper for Thai League 1 club Chonburi.

Career
Chommaphat is a product of Chonburi's academy and joined the first team in the second leg of the 2021–22 Thai League 1.
On 29 October 2022, at 19 years old, he made his Thai League 1 debut for Chonburi against Sukhothai, where both teams drew 1-1.

International career
Chommaphat represented Thailand U19 in the 2022 AFF U-19 Youth Championship.

References

2003 births
Living people
Chommaphat Boonloet
Association football goalkeepers
Chommaphat Boonloet
Chommaphat Boonloet
Chommaphat Boonloet
Chommaphat Boonloet